James Lee Byars (April 10, 1932, Detroit, Michigan – May 23, 1997, Cairo, Egypt) was an American conceptual artist and performance artist specializing in installations and sculptures, as well as a self-considered mystic. He was best known for his use of personal esoteric motifs, and his creative persona that has been described as 'half dandified trickster and half minimalist seer'.

Byars' notable performance works include The Death of James Lee Byars and The Perfect Smile, and in terms of multiple sculptures, the many letters he wrote that were composed as decorated sculptures.

Themes and motifs in his works

Byars' works are often noted as constantly incorporating specific personal themes and motifs, leaning towards the esoteric while simultaneously being ritualistic and materialistic: Robert Clark, writing for The Guardian on the occasion of a Milton Keynes exhibition of his work, described it as 'impenetrably yet intriguingly hermetic'. Most in particular was gold as a material, which served as an elemental identifier. As well as this, works of his demonstrate a fascination with the symbolism of numbers: Clark quotes in the same exhibition, referring to a specific piece of his, writing that he 'imbued the number 100 with symbolic significance, having made a symmetrical arrangement of 100 white marbles and draping 100 nude volunteers in a collective red garment'.

A common theme in his works is perfection (especially upon the word 'Perfect'), which he extended into a personal journey that led to his ambiguously celebratory exploration of shapes, numbers and precious materials. A MoMA text explaining his oeuvre, in the context of his piece The Table of Perfect, noted that while it "looks pristine, it—like any other object—can only ever exist as a sign of perfection and can never embody the total concept."

The American artist Matthew Barney played Byars in the film River of Fundament (2014), a work loosely based on the Norman Mailer novel Ancient Evenings. Barney has argued,
I think Byars had this Egyptian subtext through his work. [...] Ancient Evenings is to do with the ambition of the Pharaoh and the ambition of the nobleman to live again and again and again. So there's something about Byars that has always interested me in his work to do with its ambition to become pure gold and its failure to be pure gold. It's always a veneer. It wants to be something it can't be. And I love that about the work, I love the theatre of it.

Byars also showed fascination in predicting his own death and others' deaths.

Exhibitions 
Solo exhibitions include:
 1961	Willard Gallery, New York, NY
 1964	1 by 50 Foot Drawing, Carnegie Institute, Pittsburgh, PA
 1967	The Giant Man of Water Soluble Paper and Dissolved on 53rd Street, Museum of Contemporary Crafts, New York, NY
 1968 Participatory Events with Communal Garments, The Architectural League of New York, New York
 1970	The Gold Curb, Metropolitan Museum of Art, New York, NY
 1971	The Black Book, Galerie Michael Werner, Cologne, West Germany
 1974	The Perfect Love Letter, Palais des Beaux-Arts, Brussels, Belgium
 1975	The Perfect Kiss, Pavilion Denon, Musėe de Louvre, Paris, France
 1977	The First Total Interrogative Philosophy, Stădtisches Museum, Mönchengladbach, West Germany
 1978	The Perfect Kiss, University Art Museum, University of California at Berkeley, Berkeley, CA
 1980	The Exhibition of Perfect, Busch-Reisinger Museum, Harvard University, Cambridge, MA
 1981	The Perfect Kiss, The Perfect Cheek, The Perfect Fragrance, Foundation de Appel, Amsterdam, The Netherlands
 1983	Stedelijk van Abbemuseum, Eindhoven, The Netherlands
 1983  Musėe d'Art Moderne de la Ville de Paris, Paris, France
 1984	The Perfect Quiet, ICA, Boston, MA
 1985	Galerie Michael Werner, Cologne, West Germany
 1985  Mary Boone Gallery, New York, NY
 1986	James Lee Byars - Palast der Philosophie/The Philosophical Palace, Kunsthalle Dűsseldorf, Dűsseldorf, West Germany
 1988	Mary Boone Gallery, New York, NY
 1989	Mary Boone Gallery, New York, NY
 1989  James Lee Byars - The Palace of Good Luck, Castello di Rivoli, Museo d'Arte Contemporanea, Turin, Italy
 1990	The Perfect Thought, University Art Museum, University of California at Berkeley, Berkeley, CA
 1990  The Perfect Thought, Contemporary Arts Museum, Houston, TX
 1992	Konsthall, Stockholm, Sweden
 1993	Sonne, Mond und Sterne, Wűrttembergischer Kunstverein, Stuttgart, Germany
 1994	Graphische Răume Museum Ludwig, Cologne, Germany
 1994  James Lee Byars - The Perfect Moment, IVAM Centre del Carme, Valencia, Spain
 1995	Fondation Cartier pour l'art Contemporain, Paris, France
 1996	The Monument of Language - James Lee Byars, The Henry Moore Institute, Leeds, England
 1997	James Lee Byars - The Palace of Perfect, Fundaçao de Serralves, Porto, Portugal
 1998	James Lee Byars - Four Early Drawings and a Black Figure on the Floor, Michael Werner Gallery, New York, NY
 1998  The Arts Club of Chicago, Chicago, IL
 2001	Letters to Joseph Beuys, Museum fur Kommunikation, Frankfurt, Germany
 2003	The Moon Books: Above and Below, An Exhibition of James Lee Byars, Michael Werner Gallery, New York, NY
 2004	James Lee Byars: Letters from the World's Most Famous Unknown Artist, Massachusetts Museum of Contemporary Art, North Adams, MA
 2004  James Lee Byars: Life, Love and Death, Schirn Kunsthalle, Frankfurt, Germany
 2004  James Lee Byars: The Perfect Silence, Whitney Museum of American Art, New York, NY
 2005  Barbican Art Gallery, London, England
 2006	The Rest Is Silence: James Lee Byars, Perry Rubenstein Gallery, New York, NY
 2006  The Rest Is Silence: James Lee Byars, Michael Werner Gallery, New York, NY
 2006  The Rest Is Silence: James Lee Byars, Mary Boone Gallery, New York, NY
 2008  Im [sic] Full of Byars: James Lee Byars - Eine Hommage, Kunstmuseum Bern, Switzerland
 2008  Milton Keynes Gallery, London, England 
 2012  Klein / Byars / Kapoor, Musee d'Art Moderne et d'Art Contemporain, Nice, France 
 2012  ARoS Kunstmuseum, Aarhus, Denmark
 2013  James Lee Byars: 1/2 an Autobiography, Museo Jumex, Mexico City, Mexico
 2014  MoMA PS1, New York, NY 
 2014  FLEX, Kent Fine Art, New York, NY
 2014  James Lee Byars, Random Institute, Zűrich, Switzerland

Group shows include:
 1972  Documenta 5, Museum Fridericianum, Kassel, West Germany
 1977	Documenta 6, Museum Fridericianum, Kassel, West Germany
 1980	La Biennale di Venezia, Venice, Italy
 1981	Westkunst, Rheinhallen der Kölner Messe, Koln, West Germany
 1982	Documenta 7, Museum Fridericianum, Kassel, West Germany
 1983	New Art at the Tate Gallery, The Tate Gallery, London, England
 1983  Salone Internazionale Mercanti d'Arte, Palazzo Grassi, Venice, Italy
 1984	Skulptur im 20. Jahrhundert, Basel, Switzerland
 1984  Ouverture, Castello di Rivoli, Museo d'Arte Contemporanea, Turin, Italy
 1985	Spuren, Skulpturen und Momente ihrer präzizen Reise, Kunsthaus Zurich, Zurich, Switzerland
 1986	Biennale of Sydney, Sydney, Australia
 1986  Ooghoogte - Stedelijk van Abbemuseum 1936-1986, Stedelijk van Abbemuseum, Eindhoven, The Netherlands
 1986  La Biennale di Venezia, Venice, Italy
 1986  Europa/Amerika - Die Geschichte einer kunstlerischen Faszination seit 1940, Museum Ludwig, Cologne, West Germany
 1986  Skulptursein, Kunsthalle Dűsseldorf, Dűsseldorf, West Germany
 1987	Der Unverbrauchte Blick - Kunst unserer Zeit in Berliner Sicht, Martin-Gropius-Bau, Berlin, West Germany
 1987  Documenta 8, Museum Fridericianum, Kassel, West Germany
 1988	Űbrigens sterben immer die Anderen: Marcel Duchamp und die Avantgarde seit 1950, Museum Ludwig, Cologne, West Germany
 1989	Bilderstreit, Museum Ludwig, Rheinhallen der Kölner Messe, Cologne, West Germany
 1989  Magiciens de la Terre, Centre Georges Pompidou, Musėe National d'Art Moderne, Grand Halle - La Villette, Paris, France
 1990	Metropolis, Martin-Gropius-Bau, Berlin, Germany
 1992	Documenta 9, Museum Fridericianum, Kassel, Germany
 1994	Couplet 2, Stedelijk Museum, Amsterdam, The Netherlands
 1996	Dessins: Acquisitions 1992-1996, Galerie d'art Graphique, Musėe National d'Art Moderne, Centre Georges Pompidou, Paris, France
 1999	La Biennale di Venezia, Venice, Italy
 2001	Beau Monde: Toward a Redeemed Cosmopolitanism, SITE Santa Fe, Santa Fe, NM
 2001  The Museum of Our Wishes, Museum Ludwig, Cologne, Germany
 2002	The Inward Eye: Transcendence in Contemporary Art, Contemporary Arts Museum, Houston, TX
 2003	Louise Bourgeois, James Lee Byars - Il disparut dans le silence total, Centre Georges Pompidou, Paris, France
 2004	Singular Forms (Sometimes Repeated): Art from 1951 to the Present, Solomon R. Guggenheim Museum, New York, NY
 2004  Los Monocromos, Museo Nacional Centro de Arte Reina Sofia, Madrid, Spain
 2004  The Big Nothing, Institute of Contemporary Art, Philadelphia, PA
 2005	Colour After Klein, Barbican Art Gallery, London, England
 2013  The Encyclopedic Palace'', 55th Venice Biennale, Venice, Italy

References

Byars, James Lee
Byars, James Lee
American performance artists
American installation artists
Artists from Detroit
Deaths from cancer in Egypt